West Moreton is a region of the Australian state of Queensland, consisting of the entire rural western portion of South East Queensland. It sits inland from both the Brisbane metropolitan area and the Gold Coast and to the east of the Darling Downs. Much of the region lies in the Great Dividing Range. The name appears in the names of many community organisations and is used by the Australian Bureau of Statistics, although is not widely used otherwise due to the prevalence of South East Queensland in planning and other documents.

Geography
The West Moreton region consists of the following local government areas. Some definitions, such as the Australian Standard Geographical Classification used by the Australian Bureau of Statistics, do not include the rural part of the City of Ipswich.

Major towns
 Beaudesert
 Boonah
 Esk
 Gatton
 Kilcoy
 Laidley
 Beechmont
 Coominya
 Fernvale
 Glenore Grove
 Grandchester
 Grantham
 Harrisville
 Helidon
 Kalbar
 Lake Wivenhoe
 Lowood
 Marburg
 Minden
 Peak Crossing
 Rathdowney
 Rosewood
 Tamrookum
 Tarampa
 Toogoolawah
 Warrill View

Education

References

External links
 West Moreton region (Office of Economic and Statistical Research, Queensland Government)

Regions of Queensland
South East Queensland